CAVU can mean:
Ceiling and Visibility Unlimited, an aviation meteorology term
US Aviation CAVU, an ultralight aircraft, named after the meteorology term